The Ustyurt mountain sheep (Ovis vignei cycloceros), often referred to as the Turkmenian mountain sheep, is a subspecies of the urial that inhabits the mountain plateau regions of parts of Central Asia, especially the Ustyurt plateau from which it takes its name. It is particularly common in northern and eastern Turkmenistan and western Kazakhstan.

A number of reserves have been established in Central Asia to protect the sheep and other wildlife. The sheep are found in Gaplaňgyr Nature Reserve for instance.

External links
Central Asian northern desert

Mammals of Central Asia